Adele Wong (born 8 March 1983) is a Singaporean actress, singer, writer, and screenwriter.

Biography
Born in Singapore, Wong traces her ancestry to Shanghai, China. She graduated from the National University of Singapore (NUS) with an honors degree in sociology. At NUS, Wong was active in dance and theatre.

Upon graduation, Wong began her professional career in acting, hosting and writing. She played the lead role in Damned  which was part of an omnibus feature film which premiered at the Osaka Asian Film Festival in 2009. Wong also played a lead role in Garden Girls, a short film, which premiered at the Singapore Film Festival in 2009.

Wong has been seen in several television programs in Singapore. She recently starred as the female lead Annie in Jack Neo's first English-language drama series for Okto titled Happily Ever After.  She was also seen in the 2009 MediaCorp Chinese New Year television film, A Kuchinta Family Reunion. In July 2009, Wong played the lead female character opposite Christopher Lee in a Chinese-language television drama, He Ain't Pesky, He's My Brother, for MediaCorp's Channel 8.

Wong's feature film debut was as the female lead role in The Days which was screened at the Tokyo International Film Festival, the Singapore International Film Festival and short listed for the New Talent Award at the Shanghai International Film Festival. Wong also sang the theme song for the film, Knowing (懂), which was written and produced by Jim Lim (林倛玉).

Besides acting, Wong writes both fiction and non-fiction. She hosts a column on Sinema's website. She was also awarded a grant for a short film by the Singapore Film Commission. Hanging Gardens, starring Wong, will go into production in August 2009.

Filmography 
Short films

Damned
Garden Girls
The Gang

Feature films
The Days
Perfect Rivals

Music videos
 '懂' Knowing

Television

References

External links

1983 births
National University of Singapore alumni
Singaporean actresses
Living people
Singaporean people of Chinese descent